was a Japanese politician and a Minister of Transport. He was a member of Liberal Democratic Party. Arafune resigned the Minister of Transport by the alleged abuse of power in 1966.  Among these was requiring a National Railway express train to make regular stops at a station located in his own parliamentary constituency.

Among his most controversial actions was making a now discredited claim about the death toll of comfort women. This statement has been widely spread, with many books writing that "142,000 (or 145,000) Korean comfort women were killed by the Japanese army" or "Only about 25 per cent of Comfort women have survived".

Political career
He was born in Katashino village, Chichibu District, Saitama currently Chichibu, Saitama in 1907.
 April 11, 1946 - November 24, 1980 Member of the House of Representatives
 August 1, 1966 - October 14, 1966 Minister of Transport
 January 14, 1970 - January 29, 1972 Vice-Speaker of the House of Representatives

Comfort women
He made a public speech at his home constituency regarding the death toll of Comfort women in 1965:
They (Korean) say Koreans were drafted by Japan during the war and taken from Korea to work, and those who worked well were used as soldiers, and 576,000 of those soldiers are now dead. There are claims that 142,000 Korean comfort women are dead, killed by the Japanese military's sexual abuses.

None of the figures given by Arafune have any basis whatsoever. During the 1965 Korea-Japan Treaty negotiations, Korea's position was that 1,032,684 Koreans had been recruited to serve as laborers, soldiers, and personnel, and that 102,603 of these had been injured or had died. This figure differs with the one he gave by 576,000. Moreover, at that time, no mention was made of comfort women. However, many reports and books cited this figure directly or indirectly without fact-checking it. Some examples are as follows:

Karen Parker and Jennifer Chew wrote "Only about 25 per cent of these women are said to have survived these daily abuses." citing Arafune's statement.
UN Special Rapporteur Gay J. McDougall wrote in her report to the Commission on Human Rights "Only about 25 per cent of these women are said to have survived these daily abuses." citing a book written by Karen Parker and Jennifer Chew.
Stephanie Wolfe wrote "Karen Parker and Jennifer F. Chew state that of the approximately 200,000 women enslaved, only one-quarter survived their captivity and of these survivors, only 2,000 women were still alive in 1944.5 Today, ..."
Joseph P. Nearey wrote "Some historians believe that only thirty percent of the women survived the war. One member of the Japanese Diet (the Japanese Parliamentary institution), Representative Seijuro Arafune, publicly stated that as many as 145,000 sex slaves died during World War II." citing a book written by Karen Parker and Jennifer Chew.
Kelly Dawn Askin wrote "Repeatedly raped, tortured and abused, nearly seventy-five percent of the former 'comfort' women perished." citing a book written by Karen Parker and Jennifer F. Chew.
Anne-Marie de Brouwer wrote "It is estimated that only 25 percent of the comfort women survived" citing a book written by Kelly Dawn Askin.
Therese Park wrote "One should remember that only about 25% of the estimated 200,000 comfort women survived: some were murdered by the army so as not to leave traces of the crimes, others died as “collateral damage” during the war, and many contracted deadly diseases or committed suicide." without citing the source.
In a lawsuit filed on September 19, 2000, Former comfort women HWANG Geum Joo, et al. estimated "only 25% to 35% of the "comfort women" survived the war, and those who did suffered health effects, including damage to reproductive organs and sexually transmitted diseases." without citing the source.

His tale is attributed to his propensity to use irresponsible numbers when making public speeches. The former speaker of the House of Representatives Hajime Tamura wrote the following in his book:

See also
 Order of the Rising Sun

References

Government ministers of Japan
Members of the House of Representatives (Japan)
1907 births
1980 deaths